Borivali (Pronunciation: [boːɾiʋəliː]) is a suburb and is located at the north-western end of Mumbai and has a large Gujarati population followed by others. Traditionally the tribals and East Indians lived in Borivali.

The attractions include Sanjay Gandhi national park, fish park, Kanheri caves, Mandapeshwar caves, etc.

Borivali railway station is an originating & terminating Railway Station for Mumbai Local Trains towards Churchgate in the South & Virar in the North. Also some Express Trains halt at this Rail Station which provides ease for people travelling far off destinations.

History 

Borivali has developed from what was once a congregate region of smaller towns namely; Eksar, Poisar, Vazira, Shimpoli, Mandpeshwar, Dattapada, Kanheri, Tulsi, Magathane and Gorai, which were situated on and around Mount Poinsur, between the Dahisar River and Poisar River.

It is believed that the name "Borivali" comes from the existence of a lot of bushes of a sweet fruit called " (Marathi) meaning "berries" in English. Hence, the name means the town of berries literally "bori-vali".  The existence of the ancient temple of Lord Ganesha "Shree Svayambhu Ganpati Devalaya" in Vazira Naka area.

The pre-historic era's "Mandpeshwar" (“An 8th Century remains of a beautiful Edifice structure, Mandapeshwar caves is a rock cut architecture and a Hindu shrine of lord Shiva located near Borivali IC Colony, at walking distance from Dahisar Railway Station”) and "Kanheri caves" stand testament to the rich history of this place. Borivali was spelt "Berewlee" by the then ruled India under the British Raj. It is also spelt and pronounced as "Borivli".

Borivali is densely populated but continues to retain some green cover due to the presence of the Sanjay Gandhi National Park, previously known as the "Borivali National Park" in the east and the mangroves in the west end of Borivali.

Demographics
Borivali has a large population of Gujarati people followed by Marathis.

Borivali has three dominant languages with large Gujarati community residing in most of the suburbs of Northern Mumbai that stretches from Bhayander to Bandra, it is also shown in the linguistic demography of the suburb, while the official language Marathi is spoken by the natives of the land and migrants from other parts of Maharashtra, Hindi is the main language of communication and in trade and commerce in the suburban region of Mumbai and Mumbai Metropolitan region, is spoken by most of the North Indian Community as their native language. Marathi, the official language, is the mother tongue of 25.62% mostly in eastern part of the suburb and Gorai area, while the dominant language, Gujarati is mother tongue  of 44.13% of the population. Hindi by 20.90% as their mother tongue. Hindi is by far the major language spoken as the language of communication by all the people living in the suburbs and metropolitan area of Mumbai as their language of communication.

Landmarks 
One of the many gardens that Borivali boasts of is the Veer Savarkar Udyan on Lokmanya Tilak Road. It has four entrances from T.P.S. Road, Factory Lane and Babhai and is an ideal place for all which have facilities like jogging track, boating area, kids' play-garden, skating etc. Gorai Udyan is at Gorai Sector-1. I.C.Colony is also home to the Tukaram Ombale Garden/Fish Park which can be accessed from the Link Road and the I.C. Colony last bus stop.

In 2009, Jhansi Ki Rani Laxmibai Joggers' Park was inaugurated on Link Road adjacent to the Eskay Resort. The plot measures around 4 acres, has a jogging track surrounding a body of water where boating facilities have been started and features slabs with information on various freedom fighters scripted on them, besides seating areas for senior citizens. This Jogger's Park has a small fee for entry. Another Joggers' Park is located in Chikuwadi.

Oberoi Sky City is an upcoming township with Skyscrapers, a mall and a 5-star hotel.

The Orion is an upcoming Business Park on Sardar Vallabhbhai Patel Rd at Borivali west.

Transport
Road Ways: Autorickshaws, Taxis, BEST buses and Trains are the public modes of transport available in and to Borivali. Borivali (east) is well connected with Western Express Highway while Borivali (west) is linked to the New Link Road. Connectivity has increase with the two metro lines set to pass through Borivali viz. Mumbai Metro Line 2 and Mumbai Metro Line 7.

Railway station 

Borivali railway station is a railway station on the Western line of the Mumbai Suburban Railway network. It is one of the major platforms of the Mumbai metropolitan city and the biggest railway station in the Western railway. The platform has access to all stations from Churchgate to Virar. The platform has good connectivity for Express trains which goes to different states around the country. It has 10 platforms which were renumbered in 2019, this sudden change created a lot of confusion for everyday travelers. With every platform being busy for almost 18–20 hours a day. It is believed to be one of the blind-friendly railway stations on the western railway. Information obtained under the Right to Information (RTI) Act reveals that It is the most crowded station in Mumbai with around 2.87 lakh passengers traveling from there daily.

Notable people
 Asha Bhosale, singer
 Haribhai Parthibhai Chaudhary, politician, National Leader of the Bharatiya Janata Party
 Jaywant Dalvi, Marathi author
 Drashti Dhami, TV actress
 Bhavya Gandhi, TV actor
 Avdhoot Gupte, Marathi classical singer
 Bose Krishnamachari, Malayali painter
 Dhondutai Kulkarni, Hindustani classical singer
 Ram Naik, UP Governor, former minister
 Ratnakar Pai, Hindustani classical singer
 Rohan Shah, actor
 Rohit Sharma, Indian cricketer 
 Vinod Tawde, Member of Legislative Assembly, Minister
 Disha Vakani, TV actress

Attractions
Gorai Beach is on the western end of Borivali. One can reach here by crossing the Gorai Creek in a ferry. Rickshaw is available on the other side of the ferry. On holidays the beach is full of visitors and locals. Plenty of accommodation options are also available at Gorai beach.
EsselWorld: One of Mumbai's largest amusement parks.
Water Kingdom: Asia's largest water park.
Sanjay Gandhi National Park is one of the famous national parks within the metro limits of a major city, and one of the most visited national parks in the world.
 Our Lady of Immaculate Conception Church – Mount Poinsur, Mandapeshwar, I. C. Colony. - Roman Catholic Christian Church.
 Mandapeshwar Caves
Global Vipassana Pagoda
Mandapeshwar Caves
Kanheri Caves

Schools & Colleges
 Ryan International School
 VIBGYOR Group of Schools
Swami Vivekanand International School
 Saint Francis D'Assisi High School
 Mary Immaculate Girls' High School
 Our Lady of Vailankanni High School
 Abhinav Vidya Mandir
 The Teddy Bear's Kindergarten
 JBCN International School

See also
Dattapada
Devipada
Kandivali
Dahisar
Sanjay Gandhi National Park

References 
 

 
Suburbs of Mumbai
Talukas in Maharashtra
Mumbai Suburban district